Silent Night is the fourth album by Australian improvised music trio The Necks released on the Fish of Milk label in 1996 as a double CD. The album features a two tracks, titled "Black" and "White", performed by Chris Abrahams, Lloyd Swanton and Tony Buck.

Reception
The Australian Rolling Stone review of the album stated "The Necks create mood music of the highest calibre. Compelling and beautiful music that repays repeated listening".

Track listing
CD One:
 "Black" - 63:29
CD Two
 "White" - 53:51
All compositions by The Necks

Personnel
Chris Abrahams — piano, organ
Lloyd Swanton — bass
Tony Buck — drums, sampler

References

1996 albums
The Necks albums